Yasmina "Nina" Bouraoui (Arabicنينا بو راوي, born 1967) is a French novelist and songwriter born in Rennes, Ille-et-Vilaine to an Algerian father from the town of Jijel and a French mother. She spent the first fourteen years of her life in Algiers, then Zürich and Abu Dhabi. She now lives in Paris.

Her novels are mostly written in the first person and, with the exception of Avant les hommes, have been said by the author to be works of "auto-fiction". This is even the case for Le Bal des Murènes, which, like Avant les hommes, has a male narrator. Since writing her first novel in 1991, Bouraoui has affirmed the influence of Marguerite Duras in her work, although the life narratives and works many other artists are also to be found in her novels (and songs). This is particularly true of Mes Mauvaises Pensées which bears the imprint of Hervé Guibert, Annie Ernaux, David Lynch, Eileen Gray, and Violette Leduc amongst others. Questions of identity, desire, memory, writing, childhood and celebrity culture are some of the major themes of her work.

Works

 (1991, Prix du Livre Inter 1991), translated as Forbidden Vision (1999)
Poing mort (1992)
Le Bal des murènes (1996)
L'Âge blessé (1998)
Le Jour du séisme (1999)
Garçon manqué (2000), translated as Tomboy (2007)
La Vie heureuse (2002)
Poupée Bella (2004)
Mes mauvaises pensées (2005, Prix Renaudot)
Avant les hommes (2007)
Appelez-moi par mon prénom (2008)
Nos baisers sont des adieux (2010)
Sauvage (2011)
Standard (2014)
Beaux rivages (2016)
Tous les hommes désirent naturellement savoir (2018)
Otages (2020) Prix Anaïs Nin 2020

In 2007, she wrote two songs for Céline Dion titled "Immensité" and "Les paradis", set to music respectively by Jacques Veneruso and Gildas Arzel. These songs were featured on Céline Dion's album, D'elles, which came out 21 May 2007.

References

External links

 Page dedicated to Nina Bouraoui in Littératures du Maghreb
 Article in L'Express
 Présentation in Lire
 La Beurgeoisie The French website for successful "Beurs".

1967 births
Living people
Writers from Rennes
French songwriters
French lesbian writers
French people of Algerian descent
Prix Renaudot winners
Prix du Livre Inter winners
French LGBT novelists
French LGBT rights activists
20th-century French women writers
20th-century French non-fiction writers
French women novelists
Prix Emmanuel Roblès recipients
Officiers of the Ordre des Arts et des Lettres